Wheelchair racing at the 2000 Summer Olympics featured as a demonstration event within the athletics programme on 28 September 2000. There were two events, an 800 m race for women and a 1500 m race for men. Medals were not awarded, as the sport was not part of the official competition.

Men's 1500 m wheelchair

Women's 800 m wheelchair

See also
Athletics at the 2000 Summer Paralympics

References

Athletics at the 2000 Sydney Summer Games: Men's 1,500 metres Wheelchair. Sports Reference. Retrieved on 2014-05-11.
Athletics at the 2000 Sydney Summer Games: Women's 800 metres Wheelchair. Sports Reference. Retrieved on 2014-05-11.
 Track and field results. ESPN/Associated Press. Retrieved on 2014-05-11.

Wheelchair racing
2000
Men's events at the 2000 Summer Olympics
Women's events at the 2000 Summer Olympics